Interleukin-36 beta also known as interleukin-1 family member 8 (IL1F8) is a protein that in humans is encoded by the IL36B gene.

Function 

The protein encoded by this gene is a member of the interleukin 1 cytokine family. Protein structure modeling indicated that this cytokine may contain a 12-stranded beta-trefoil structure that is conserved between IL1A (IL-A alpha) and IL1B (IL-1 beta). This gene and eight other interleukin 1 family genes form a cytokine gene cluster on chromosome 2. Two alternatively spliced transcript variants encoding distinct isoforms have been reported.

References

Further reading